Artitropa comus, the western nightfighter, is a species of butterfly in the family Hesperiidae. It is found in Senegal, Guinea, Sierra Leone, Liberia, Ivory Coast, Ghana, Togo, Nigeria, Cameroon, Gabon, the Republic of the Congo, the Democratic Republic of the Congo and Zambia. The habitat consists of forests.

Adults are attracted to pawpaw flowers.

The larvae feed on Dracaena species, including Dracaena uganda, Dracaena manni, Dracaena usambarensis, Dracaena reflexa var. nitens, Dracaena steudneri and Dracaena perrotteti.

References

Butterflies described in 1782
Hesperiinae